Chợ Mới is a rural district of Bắc Kạn province in the Northeast region of Vietnam. As of 2003 the district had a population of 37,665. The district covers an area of 606 km2. The district capital lies at Chợ Mới.

Administrative divisions
The district is divided into one township, Chợ Mới (the district capital) and communes:

Quảng Chu
Yên Đĩnh
Như Cố
Bình Văn
Yên Hân
Yên Cư
Thanh Bình
Nông Hạ
Nông Thịnh
Cao Kỳ
Tân Sơn
Hòa Mục
Thanh Vận
Thanh Mai
Mai Lạp

References

Districts of Bắc Kạn province